Wilfred John Brimblecombe, CBE (6 February 1898 – 14 September 1973) was an Australian politician. Born in Laidley, Queensland, he was educated at Ipswich Grammar School and then Queensland Agricultural College. He was a farmer, and served in the military 1915–1919, after which he was a councillor on Wambo Shire Council. In 1951, he was elected to the Australian House of Representatives as the Country Party member for Maranoa, defeating the sitting member, Charles Russell, who had been expelled from the Country Party for supporting the appreciation of the pound. He held the seat until his retirement in 1966. Brimblecombe died in 1973.

References

National Party of Australia members of the Parliament of Australia
Members of the Australian House of Representatives for Maranoa
Members of the Australian House of Representatives
Commanders of the Order of the British Empire
1898 births
1973 deaths
20th-century Australian politicians